Catherine Michele Stefani is an American attorney politician from San Francisco. Stefani has served on the San Francisco Board of Supervisors since 2018, representing District 2, which includes the neighborhoods of Pacific Heights, Cow Hollow, the Marina District and Laurel Heights.

Early life and education
Stefani earned a bachelor's degree in government from Saint Mary's College of California, followed by a Master of Laws and Juris Doctor from the University of the Pacific's McGeorge School of Law.

Career

Early career 
After graduating from law school, she was a deputy district attorney in Contra Costa County. She was an aide to San Jose Vice Mayor Cindy Chavez and California State Assembly member Herb Wesson. Stefani served as a legislative aide to San Francisco Supervisors Michela Alioto-Pier (2007-2011) and  Mark Farrell (2011-2016).

From 2000 to 2003, Stefani developed, hosted, and produced For The Record, a television show about legal issues. She is a spokesperson for Moms Demand Action for Gun Sense in America and the co-founder and former leader of the group's San Francisco chapter. She was on the Board of Directors of the Homeless Prenatal Program. She's a graduate and supporter of Emerge America.

San Francisco County Clerk
Stefani was appointed as the San Francisco County Clerk by Mayor Ed Lee on January 29, 2016.

San Francisco Board of Supervisors
When Mark Farrell resigned as District 2 Supervisor to become Mayor of San Francisco in January 2018, he selected Stefani as his successor. An hour after she was sworn-in, Stefani formally declared her candidacy for the position in the upcoming November election and went on to win election to a full term.

Economy 
In September 2020, during the COVID-19 pandemic crisis, Stefani was the lone vote in dissent of the budget proposal, declaring it "fiscally irresponsible." 

In response to a pay-to-play corruption scandal in which city officials were arrested for taking bribes in exchange for awarding city contracts, in July 2020 Stefani introduced the "No GRAFT Act". The legislation closes a loophole in the city's contract procedures to prevent corruption.

On May 12, 2020, Stefani resigned from her position on the Behavioral Health Commission Board over alleged financial impropriety, contract mismanagement, and inappropriately applying for and accepting a Paycheck Protection Program loan from the Small Business Administration. She introduced legislation to end the contract between the Commission and the non-profit that was contracted to provide staffing and support in a move to "reform the structure of the Behavioral Health Commission to eliminate any corrupt or inappropriate behavior in its administration."

In February 2019 Stefani challenged the renewal of a multi-million dollar contract with another mental health services provider pointing out that the organization "are not scoring highly on RFPs, have not always met standards and are not at their budgeted level of deliverables".

Public safety 
In response to an increase of car break-ins in early 2018, Stefani called for a series of hearings with the San Francisco Police Department. Later that year, after a successful test of increased security at two San Francisco municipal garages, Stefani called for the increased security methods to be implemented at all 22 public garages. In October 2020 she called for a red light camera at an intersection in her district where a pedestrian had been killed earlier that year.

Gun violence prevention 

Shortly after taking office, Stefani introduced the Free Speech Protection Act prohibiting firearms within  of public events of 50 people or more such as protests, marches and rallies. Law enforcement is excepted from the prohibition. After the Gilroy Garlic Festival shooting, Stefani introduced a resolution that designated the National Rifle Association a domestic terrorist organization. On September 4, 2019, the Board of Supervisors passed the resolution with a unanimous vote. In April 2019 she requested the San Francisco City Attorney draft legislation to implement gun violence restraining orders which would allow firearms to be temporarily seized from owners who pose a safety risk to themselves or others.

Other 
In 2019, Stefani voted for a resolution to declare a state of emergency for traffic injuries and deaths in San Francisco, reaffirming the city's 2014 Vision Zero commitment. However, Stefani has opposed public bike share in District 2 in private meetings with residents and has not advocated for the expansion of protected bike lanes and transit in the district.

In March 2019 Stefani called for a hearing to investigate the lack of mental health services available to San Francisco's homeless population, and requested more hospital beds for those who need psychiatric treatment.

After the closing of the Clay Theater, an historic single-screen movie theater, in March 2020 Stefani introduced legislation to limit the use of such theaters in an attempt to preserve them.

In 2018, after much objection by the Italian-American community over the renaming of Columbus Day to Indigenous Peoples' Day, Stefani – who is of Italian descent – introduced a compromise legislation for an ordinance declaring that the day also be recognized as Italian Heritage Day. When the Christopher Columbus statue at San Francisco's Coit Tower was removed by city officials in June 2020 during the George Floyd protests, Stefani supported the removal, stating that while "Columbus has historically been a symbol of pride in Italian Americans’ contribution to this nation [he] also represents the painful foundations of American history — the slavery, subjugation and conquest we must all condemn."

Stefani was a co-sponsor of an ordinance in October 2018 that required 30% of public artwork in the city depicting historical figures be women. The first monument to be erected would depict poet and civil rights activist Maya Angelou. The San Francisco Arts Commission's selection panel recommended visual artist Lava Thomas' proposal, a 9-foot tall bronze book with Angelou's face and quote etched onto it. However, the proposal was rejected by the Commission's Visual Arts Committee. Stefani led this decision, calling for the SFAC to restart the selection process with clearer criteria for a what constituted a monument. Stefani justified this decision, according to the San Francisco Examiner, stating, "As I carried the legislation across the finish line to elevate women in monuments, I wanted to do it in the same way that men have been historically elevated in this city." This decision to confirm Thomas' proposal sparked public backlash. Stefani subsequently apologized and Thomas' proposal was accepted in November 2020.

Personal life
Stefani lives in Cow Hollow, San Francisco. She and her husband have two children. 

Her cousin is singer-songwriter Gwen Stefani.

She and her husband are landlords. In June 2020, amid the COVID-19 pandemic, she was the only member of the Board of Supervisors to vote against a pandemic-related eviction moratorium.

References

Living people
San Francisco Board of Supervisors members
Women city councillors in California
21st-century American politicians
21st-century American women politicians
California Democrats
Saint Mary's College of California alumni
McGeorge School of Law alumni
1969 births
County clerks in California